Pterochiton is an extinct genus of polyplacophoran molluscs.

References 

Prehistoric chiton genera
Paleozoic life of Alberta